Roku is a fictional supervillain and Antihero appearing in books published by the American publisher Valiant Comics. The character was created by Matt Kindt and Clay Mann.

Fictional character biography
Roku's original identity was Angelina Alcott, MI-6 agent and the daughter of another MI-6 agent, Neville Alcott. Angelina is the secret service liaison and spycraft instructor to novice trainee Colin King. While training, the two begin a secret affair. Colin fails an assignment against an assassin named Xaman, a follower of the Undead Monk. The next night when Angelina and Colin are having sex, several gunmen hired by Xaman attack them, and Colin believes that Angelina is killed. He continues his training under Angelina's father.

Angelina is not dead, however; a group of students of the Undead Monk has taken her to their teacher's monastery, where the hidden benefactor of their order, Master Darque, performs dark magic on her. Awakening with little to no memory of who she was, Roku believes she'd come to their temple searching for her brother. After undergoing a metaphysical surgical procedure which  wipes her former life and past self from her conscious memory, she finds herself buried deep beneath the earth, wrapped in bandaging.

Suddenly finding that she has total control over her body, she uses her shade-changing hair to tunnel out of the earth, only to find herself within a cave populated by ghouls and demons. Each new demon she encounters asks her a question relating to her old self. She defeats them all and climbs out of a deep dark well. She is met by the Undead Monk's students, who inducted her into their order.

Having forgotten her old name, she adopts the alias Rokurokubi (Roku). Meanwhile, Colin King has infiltrated the Undead Monk's organization, and eventually kills Xaman to avenge Angelina's death. He becomes a ninja agent in MI-6 with the alias "Ninja-K", or Ninjak.

Roku meets the Shadow Seven, heads of the Weaponeer organization and former top students of the Undead Monk, and is assigned to work under Kannon as his bodyguard and right-hand woman.

While out on a routine mission, Roku is captured and imprisoned in a Russian confinement cell. She uses her powers to make her jailers shoot themselves with their own pistols; as she is hacking their computers before her escape, Ninjak appears before her. The two engage in a battle, which ends when Ninjak triggers a detonation and disappears.

Roku becomes one of the Shadow Seven. She and Ninjak encounter each other a number of times.

Roku attacks Colin King/Ninjak in different ways, planting explosives in his home and managing to frame him for murder, all in order to get revenge. They meet in Venezuela, where Colin's former butler Alain is held captive. Roku has regained some of her former memory, and she reveals her identity and the fact that she has murdered Colin's parents in order to get to him. Colin explains to her that he tried to avenge her death. Alain comes in to save Colin by distracting Roku long enough for Colin to escape before the house explodes.

After the explosion, Roku escapes from the rubble and realizes that her real enemy is Master Darque. Locating the tree encasing Master Darque's dark magic, she cuts it down with her Katana in order to free herself from his influence.

In other media

Web series
Roku appears in Ninjak vs. the Valiant Universe, portrayed by Chantelle Barry

References

Comics characters introduced in 2013
Valiant Comics characters
Valiant Comics superheroes
Valiant Comics supervillains